Daniel Crémieux (born May 22, 1938) is a French fashion designer best known for his preppy style clothing, mainly menswear. He launched his brand, Daniel Crémieux, in 1976 in France.

Personal life 
Born on May 22, 1938, in Marseille, Daniel Crémieux went to London when he was seventeen to study English.

Career 
Daniel's fondness for fashion started when he was very young. His father owned clothing stores in the south of France, and he was constantly surrounded by beautiful clothes. 

When he was seventeen, Daniel went to London to study English. It was there that he discovered the stylish elegance of braces, badges and checked pullovers worn with pride by university students. Upon his return to France, Daniel brought back a seamless Shetland sweater, something quite unknown in France at the time, and with it the foundation for his vision of a sophisticated interpretation of the emerging Preppy look.

He flew to New York in late 60's and fell more deeply in love with the preppy menswear of traditional brands. He returned to France with the desire to create the best French preppy brand available, a modern interpretation of this very traditional look.

In 1976, Daniel Crémieux launched his own brand, with an iconic golfer as its logo, and opened his first shop in Saint-Tropez, on the French Riviera between Nice and Marseille. This was the first store, soon to be followed by others in Paris and Aix Provence. 

Today, Crémieux is an international brand with shops in France, United Kingdom and United States.

References

External links 

 

Designers
French designers